Chrysis smaragdula is a species of cuckoo wasp in the family Chrysididae.

References 

Chrysidinae
Insects described in 1825